Life Cinematic is a BBC television series of in-depth interviews with notable filmmakers, with clips from movies that have influenced them. With The Film Review and associated programs, Life Cinematic fills the gap left by the cancellation of the BBCs long-running Film... series in 2018. It is produced by Somethin’ Else and presented either by Edith Bowman or Robbie Collin, who give a brief résumé of the interviewee's career before conducting the interview. In the first 60-minute episode, broadcast 30 January 2020, Bowman spoke with Sir Sam Mendes, the British director whose blockbuster film 1917 was released three weeks previously.

Episodes

References

External links

2020 British television series debuts
2021 British television series endings
BBC Television shows